Daryl Mitchell may refer to:

 Daryl Mitchell (actor) (born 1965), American actor
 Daryl Mitchell (English cricketer) (born 1983), English cricketer who played for Worcestershire
 Daryl Mitchell (New Zealand cricketer) (born 1991), New Zealand international cricketer who also plays for Canterbury